Shkodran Veseli (born December 11, 1990) is a Swiss kickboxer of Albanian origin who competes in the welterweight division. He formerly competed in Superkombat Fighting Championship (SUPERKOMBAT).

Titles and accomplishments
World Kickboxing and Karate Union
 2015 WKU K-1 European Champion 
 2017 WKU K-1 World Champion

Final Fight Championship
 2018 FFC Welterweight Champion

World Association of Kickboxing Organizations
 2009 WAKO Pro Austrian Champion

 2013 SPF European Champion

Fight record

|-  bgcolor="#fbb"
| 2022-09-17 || Loss ||align=left| Endy Semeleer || Glory Rivals 2 ||  Alkmaar, Netherlands || KO (Right hook) || 3 || 1:05

|-  bgcolor="#fbb"
| 2022-06-04 || Loss ||align=left| Marvin Monteirp || Enfusion 107||  Darmstadt, Germany ||Decision (Unanimous) || 3 || 3:00

|-  bgcolor="#fbb"
| 2019-09-07 || Loss ||align=left| Regilio Van Den Ent || Enfusion ||  Darmstadt, Germany ||Decision  || 3 || 3:00

|-  bgcolor="#fbb"
| 2019-04-13 || Loss ||align=left| Parviz Abdullayev ||  Vendetta Champions Night||  Istanbul, Turkey || TKO || 3 || 

|-  style="background:#cfc;"
| 2018-10-12 || Win||align=left| Francois Ambang || FFC 31: Las Vegas  || Las Vegas, Nevada || KO (Punches) || 4 ||  1:23
|-
! style=background:white colspan=9 |

|-  style="background:#cfc;"
| 2018-4-21 || Win||align=left| Sergej Braun ||Enfusion: Dillingen || Dillingen, Germany || TKO (Left hook to the body) || 1 || 
|-
|-  style="background:#cfc;"
| 2017-10-21 || Win||align=left| Dimitrios Chiotis || FFC 31: Linz  || Linz, Austria || TKO || 2 || 

|-  style="background:#cfc;"
| 2017-05-27 || Win||align=left| Levan Guruli || The Story || Olten, Switzerland || KO || 5 || 
|-
! style=background:white colspan=9 |

|-  bgcolor="#fbb"
| 2017-02-25 || Loss||align=left| Diogo Calado || Illyrian Fight Night II || Winterthur, Switzerland || Decision (Unanimous) || 5 || 3:00

|-  style="background:#Fbb;"
| 2016-09-23 || Loss||align=left| Eyevan Danenberg || FFC 26: Linz  || Linz, Austria || Decision (Unanimous) || 3 ||  3:00

|-  style="background:#cfc;"
| 2016-04-30 || Win||align=left| Jan Mazur ||  Admiral Dome	|| Vienna, Austria || Decision  || 3 ||  3:00

|-  style="background:#cfc;"
| 2016-02-27 || Win||align=left| Fabio Texeira ||  llyrian Fight Night	|| Winterthour, Switzerland || Decision  || 3 ||  3:00

|-  style="background:#fbb;"
| 2015-12-05 || Loss||align=left| Djibril Ehouo ||  Swiss Las Vegas Fusion  || Spreitenbach, Switzerland || Decision  || 5 ||  3:00
|-
! style=background:white colspan=9 |

|-  style="background:#cfc;"
| 2015-11-07 || Win||align=left| Adelino Boa Morte|| Enfusion Live  || Switzerland || Decision  || 3 ||  3:00

|-  style="background:#cfc;"
| 2015-10-03 || Win||align=left| Christos Avramidie ||  Fight 4 Glory  || Bienne, Switzerland || Decision  || 3 ||  3:00

|-  style="background:#cfc;"
| 2015-06-13 || Win||align=left| Anghel Cardos ||  Superkombat Special Edition  || Spreitenbach, Switzerland || Decision (Unanimous) || 3 ||  3:00

|-  bgcolor="#fbb"
| 2015-05-30 || Loss ||align=left| Vladimír Moravčík || Full Fight 1 - Slovakia and Czech vs. Russia || Banska Bystrica, Slovakia || Decision (Unanimous) || 3 || 3:00

|-  style="background:#cfc;"
| 2015-04-25 || Win||align=left| Francesco Palermo || Swiss Las Vegas: Basel  || Basel, Switzerland || Decision (Unanimous) || 3 ||  3:00
|-

|-  style="background:#cfc;"
| 2015-02-21 || Win||align=left| Darryl Sichtman || Gladiators Night  || Baden, Switzerland || Decision  || 3 ||  3:00
|-
! style=background:white colspan=9 |

|-  style="background:#cfc;"
| 2014-12-06 || Win||align=left| Duoli Chen || FFC 16: Vienna  || Vienna, Austria || Decision (Unanimous) || 3 ||  3:00

|-  style="background:#c5d2ea;"
| 2014-09-13 || Draw||align=left| Marco Pique ||  Gladiators Night	|| Baden, Switzerland ||  Decision  || 3 || 3:00

|-  style="background:#cfc;"
| 2014-06-06 || Win||align=left| Vlado Konsky || FFC 13: Zadar  || Zadar, Croatia || Decision (Unanimous) || 3 ||  3:00

|-  style="background:#cfc;"
| 2014-05-10 || Win||align=left| Pavol Garaj || Fight Night || Olten, Switzerland || Decision (Unanimous) || 3 ||  3:00
|-
|-  style="background:#cfc;"
| 2014-04-04 || Win||align=left| Stefan Zivkovic || FFC 11: Osijek  || Osijek , Croatia ||  KO (Flying Knee)  || 3 ||  1:14
|-
|-  style="background:#fbb;"
| 2014-02-22 || Loss ||align=left| Marco Pique ||  Fight Night || Wien , Austria ||  Decision (Split)  || 3 || 3:00

|-  style="background:#cfc;"
| 2013-12-13 || Win||align=left| Ile Risteski || FFC 10: Rodriguez vs. Batzelas || Skopje , North Macedonia ||  KO (High Kick)  || 1 ||  1:15

|-
|-  style="background:#cfc;"
| 2013-06-01 || Win||align=left| Hakim Boulman || Art of Fighting: Winterthur  || Winterthur, Switzerland || Decision (Unanimous) || 3 ||  3:00
|-
! style=background:white colspan=9 |

|-  style="background:#cfc;"
| 2013-03-23 || Win||align=left|  Alexander Sakotic || Challenger Series: Thailand vs Europe || Neu-Ulm, Germany || Decision|| 3 ||  3:00

|-  style="background:#Fbb;"
| 2012-12-08 || Loss||align=left| Duoli Chen || Vandetta VI: Vienna  || Vienna, Austria || TKO || 3 ||  3:00
|-

|-  style="background:#cfc"
| 2012-03-06 || Win ||align=left| Giga Chikadze  || WFC Challengers 3 || Vienna, Austria || KO (Punches)|| 2 || 

|-  style="background:#cfc"
| 2011-12-18 || Win ||align=left| Ongjen Topavolic  ||  WFC 15 Olimp Sport Nutrition || Ljubljana, Slovenia || KO (Punches) || 2 || 

|-  style="background:#fbb"
| 2011-06-12 || Loss ||align=left| Fabjan Miran  ||  WFC 14 || Vienna, Austria || TKO (Doctor stoppage)|| 4 || 

|-  style="background:#fbb;"
| 2010-11-20 || Loss ||align=left| Miso Halada || Hanuman Cup 6 || Nitra, Slovakia || Decision || 5 || 3:00
|-

|-  style="background:#cfc;"
| 2009-09-20 || Win ||align=left| Kuki Stone || Fight Night Super Heroes || Vienna, Austria || TKO ||  ||

|-  style="background:#cfc;"
| 2009-02-22 || Win ||align=left| Ndombi Kande ||  Knock Out Fight-Night || Vienna, Austria || ||  || 
|-
! style=background:white colspan=9 |
|-
| colspan=9 | Legend:

References

External links
 
 Profile at finalfightchampionship.com 
 Profile at muaythaitv.us 

1990 births
Living people
Welterweight kickboxers
Swiss male kickboxers
SUPERKOMBAT kickboxers